Erik Rhodes (born Ernest Sharpe; February 10, 1906 – February 17, 1990) was an American film and Broadway singer and actor. He is best remembered today for appearing in two classic Hollywood musical films with the popular dancing team of Fred Astaire and Ginger Rogers: The Gay Divorcee (1934) and Top Hat (1935).

Early years
Rhodes was born Earnest R. Sharpe at El Reno, Indian Territory, now Oklahoma, the son of Mr. and Mrs. Ernest A. Sharpe.  He attended Central High School and the University of Oklahoma. While he was a student at the university, he earned a scholarship that enabled him to spend a year in New York studying voice. 

During World War II, Rhodes was a language specialist in the intelligence service of the Army Air Force.

Career
Rhodes started performing on the Broadway stage in A Most Immoral Lady (1928) using his birth name, Ernest R. Sharpe. This was followed by two musicals, The Little Show (1929) and Hey Nonny Nonny! (1932).

He first used the name Erik Rhodes when he appeared on Broadway in Gay Divorce (1932) and again in London in 1933. In this show, he gave a memorable comic portrayal of a spirited, feather-brained, thick-accented Italian character that impressed RKO executives enough to bring him to Hollywood to reprise the role in the film version, The Gay Divorcee (1934) and then repeated in Top Hat (1935), much to Mussolini's displeasure.

In 1946, he was called in to take over a role in the Vernon Duke musical Sweet Bye and Bye during its tryout, but the show closed before reaching Broadway. Between 1947 and 1964, he was back on Broadway in The Great Campaign, Dance Me a Song, Collector's Item, Shinbone Alley, Jamaica, How to Make a Man, and A Funny Thing Happened on the Way to the Forum. In the Cole Porter musical Can-Can, he appeared as a lecherous art critic, and introduced the song "Come Along With Me".

Rhodes also acted in regional theater, including Playhouse on the Mall in Paramus, New Jersey, and the Forrest Theatre in Philadelphia.

On radio, Rhodes was heard regularly on the variety show 51 East 51st. On television, he was co-host of Second Cup of Coffee, which debuted on WJZ in New York City on October 15, 1952. The Monday-Friday 15-minute daytime program combined talk and music. Among his other TV appearances, he performed in the variety program Wonder Boy and played the role of murder victim Herman Albright in the 1961 Perry Mason episode, "The Case of the Violent Vest."

Death
Rhodes died of pneumonia in an Oklahoma City nursing home on February 17, 1990, at age 84 and is interred with his wife in the El Reno Cemetery in El Reno, Oklahoma.

Filmography

Film

 Give Her a Ring (1934) – Otto Brune
 The Gay Divorcee (1934) – Rodolfo Tonetti
 Charlie Chan in Paris (1935) – Max Corday
 A Night at the Ritz (1935) – Leopold Jaynos
 The Nitwits (1935) – George Clark
 Old Man Rhythm (1935) – Frank Rochet
 Top Hat (1935) – Alberto Beddini
 Another Face (1935) – Grimm – Assistant Director
 Two in the Dark (1936) – Carlo Gheet
 Chatterbox (1936) – Mr. Archie Fisher
 Special Investigator (1936) – Benny Gray
 One Rainy Afternoon (1936) – Count Alfredo Donstelli
 Second Wife (1936) – Dave Bennet
 Smartest Girl in Town (1936) – Baron Enrico Torene
 Criminal Lawyer (1937) – Bandini
 Woman Chases Man (1937) – Henri Saffron
 Music for Madame (1937) – Spaghetti Nadzio
 Fight for Your Lady (1937) – Anton Spadissimo
 Beg, Borrow or Steal (1937) – Lefevre
 The Canary Comes Across (1938, Short) – Canary Dillon
 Meet the Girls (1938) – Maurice Leon
 Mysterious Mr. Moto (1938) – David Scott-Frensham
 Say It in French (1938) – Irving
 Dramatic School (1938) – Georges Mounier
 On Your Toes (1939) – Konstantin Morrisine
 Hollywood The Golden Years: The RKO Story (1987, TV Series documentary) – Himself

Television
 The Chevrolet Tele-Theatre (1948, Episode: "Mirage in Manhattan")
 Appointment with Adventure (1955, Episode: "Escape from Vienna")
 Perry Mason (1961, Episode: "The Case of the Violent Vest") – Herman Albright

Broadway

 A Most Immoral Lady (1928)
 The Little Show (1929)
 Hey Nonny Nonny! (1932)
 Gay Divorce (1932)
 The Great Campaign (1947)
 Dance Me a Song (1950)
 Collector's Item (1952)
 Can-Can (1953)
 Shinbone Alley (1957)
 Jamaica (1957)
 How to Make a Man (1961)
 A Funny Thing Happened on the Way to the Forum (1962)

Notes

References

External links

  Retrieved on 2009-01-24
  Retrieved on 2009-01-24
 
 Erik Rhodes papers, 1923–1979 (bulk 1950-1960s), held by the Billy Rose Theatre Division, New York Public Library for the Performing Arts

1906 births
1990 deaths
American male dancers
American male film actors
United States Army Air Forces personnel of World War II
American male stage actors
Deaths from pneumonia in Oklahoma
Nightlife in New York City
Male actors from Oklahoma
20th-century American male actors
20th-century American dancers